This is a list of notable professional associations which are international organizations. These organizations are either chartered by international bodies or by relevant national professional associations from multiple countries.

 
 AABB (formerly American Association of Blood Banks)
 Academy of International Business (AIB)
 Academy of Management (AOM)
 American Psychological Association (APA)
 American Institute of Certified Public Accountants (AICPA)
 Association for the Advancement of Cost Engineering (AACE International)
 Association for Computing Machinery (ACM)
 Association for Volunteer Administration (AVA)
 Association for Law, Property and Society (ALPS)
 Association for Materials Protection and Performance (AMPP)
 Association of Chartered Certified Accountants (ACCA)
 Association of Certified Anti-Money Laundering Specialists (ACAMS)
 Association of Certified Fraud Examiners (ACFE)
 Association of Records Managers and Administrators (ARMA International)
 Association of Information Technology Professionals (AITP)
 American Institute of Aeronautics and Astronautics (AIAA)
 American Medical Informatics Association (AMIA)
 American Society for Quality (ASQ)
 American Society of Civil Engineers (ASCE)
 American Water Works Association (AWWA)
 CBV Institute (CBV)
 CFA Institute (CFA)
 CMT Association (CMT)
 Certified Financial Planner Board of Standards
 Chartered Global Management Accountant (CGMA)
 Chartered Institute of Management Accountants (CIMA)
 The Chartered Institute of Marketing (CIM)
 Chartered Management Institute (CMI)
 CPA Canada (CPA)
 Color Marketing Group (CMG)
 Commission on Isotopic Abundances and Atomic Weights (CIAAW)
 Ellevate Network
 European Alliance for Innovation (EAI)
 Information Systems Audit and Control Association (ISACA)
 Information Systems Security Association (ISSA)
 Institute of Consulting (IC)
 Institute of Directors (IoD)
 Institute of Electrical and Electronics Engineers (IEEE)
 Institute of Food Technologists
 Institute of Internal Auditors (IIA)
 Institute of Management Accountants (IMA)
 Institute of Marine Engineering, Science and Technology (IMarEST)
 Institute of Mechanical Engineers (IMechE)
 Institute of Transportation Engineers
 Institution of Chemical Engineers (IChemE)
 Institution of Civil Engineers (ICE)
 Institution of Occupational Safety and Health (IOSH)
 Institution of Railway Signal Engineers (IRSE)
 International Council of Nurses (ICN)
 Institution of Engineering and Technology (IET)
 Institution of Structural Engineers (IStructE)
 International Association of Accessibility Professionals
 International Association of Administrative Professionals (IAAP)
 International Association of Amusement Parks and Attractions (IAAPA)
 International Association for Bridge and Structural Engineering (IABSE)
 International Association of Business Communicators (IABC)
 International Association of Chiefs of Police (IACP)
 International Association for Plant Taxonomy (IAPT)
 International Association of Forensic Linguists (IAFL)
 International Association of Hydrogeologists (IAH) Groundwater specialists
 International Association of Medical Colleges (IAOMC)
 International Association of Privacy Professionals (IAPP)
 International Association of Professional Translators and Interpreters (IAPTI)
 International Astronomical Union (IAU)
 International Council of Museums (ICOM)
 International Council of Shopping Centers (ICSC)
 International Council on Systems Engineering (INCOSE)
 International Facility Management Association (IFMA)
 International Federation of Inventors' Associations (IFIA)
 International Federation for Information Processing (IFIP)
 International Federation of Intellectual Property Attorneys (FICPI)
 International Federation of Robotics (IFR)
 International Federation of Shipmasters' Associations (IFSMA)
 International Federation of Translators (FIT)
 International Institute of Business Analysis (IIBA)
 International Planetarium Society (IPS)
 International Society of Automation (ISA)
 International Spinal Cord Society (ISCoS)
 International Union of Pure and Applied Chemistry (IUPAC)
 Latin American Studies Association (LASA)
 National Association of Parliamentarians (NAP)
 National Council of Structural Engineers Associations (NCSEA)
 NACE International, corrosion control industry association
 PEN International (writers)
 Project Management Institute (PMI)
 Royal Institution of Chartered Surveyors (RICS)
 Society for Human Resource Management (SHRM)
 Society of Automotive Engineers (SAE International)
 Society of American Military Engineers (SAME)
 Society of Manufacturing Engineers (SME)
 Society for Technical Communication (STC)
 Society of Tribologists and Lubrication Engineers (STLE)
 Society of Indexers (SI)
 Society for Protective Coatings (SSPC)
 Society of Petroleum Engineers (SPEI)
 Strategic Management Society (SMS)
 Urban Land Institute (ULI)
 Water Environment Federation (WEF)
 World Association of Chefs Societies (WACS)
 World Federation of Engineering Organizations (WFEO)
 World Federation of Neurosurgical Societies

See also 
 List of learned societies

 
International professional associations